Parliamentary Republic may refer to:

 Parliamentary republic, a republican form of government with a parliamentary system and a ceremonial or parliament-elected head of state
 History of Chile during the Parliamentary Era (1891–1925)
 French Third Republic (1870–1940)
 French Fourth Republic (1946–1958)